Kaarina Koskinen (born 20 April 1944) is a Finnish gymnast. She competed in five events at the 1964 Summer Olympics.

References

1944 births
Living people
Finnish female artistic gymnasts
Olympic gymnasts of Finland
Gymnasts at the 1964 Summer Olympics
Sportspeople from Turku
20th-century Finnish women